Charles H. Clark (June 11, 1818 – November 20, 1873) was the mayor of Rochester, New York from 1858 to 1859.

Clark was born in Saybrook, Conn., June 11, 1818. He taught in the academy in Clinton, Conn., for a year after graduating from Yale College in 1841; and then studied law, first in Saybrook, and subsequently in Rochester, N. Y. He was admitted to the bar in October 1845, and was for many years a successful lawyer in Rochester. In 1858 he was mayor of the city, and in June 1863, was appointed Colonel of the 54th Regiment of the N. Y. State National Guard. He died in Rochester, November 20, 1870, aged 52, having been affected for nearly a year with an organic disease of the heart which was apparently complicated with a disease of the brain.  He married, March 8, 1848, Miss Maria B. Viele, of Saratoga County, N. Y., who with his two sons is survived him.

External links 

Mayors of Rochester, New York
1818 births
1873 deaths
People from Deep River, Connecticut
New York (state) lawyers
Yale College alumni
19th-century American politicians
19th-century American lawyers